Angela Donald (born 4 December 1995) is an Australian artistic gymnast and is the 2010 Bronze Medal Winner for the Beam at the Youth Olympic Games in Singapore.

Donald began her gymnastics career at age 9. She is half Chinese (mother) and loves water sports such as parasailing. She says that her favorite memory in gymnastics is "Hearing the head coach call my name for the Australian Team to compete for Germany." Her tips on how to become a top athlete; "Work Hard and never lose sight of your goals and dreams." She cites Nastia Liukin, Georgia Bonora, Shona Morgan and Emma Dennis as her influences.

Career

2010s 
Donald competed at the 2010 Youth Olympics in Singapore where she won the bronze medal in the Beam Competition, coming behind China's Tan Sixin and Italy's Carlotta Ferlito.

She was also a contender training for the 2012 Olympics team.

References

Australian female artistic gymnasts
Gymnasts at the 2010 Summer Youth Olympics
Sportspeople from Melbourne
1995 births
Living people
21st-century Australian women